Le bonheur (French for "happiness") may refer to:

 Le Bonheur (1934 film), a 1934 French film
 Le Bonheur (1965 film), a 1965 French film
 Le Bonheur Children's Hospital, Memphis, Tennessee, USA
 Le Bonheur (Storm Large album), 2014
 Le Bonheur (Brigitte Fontaine and Areski Belkacem album), 1975

See also
Bonheur (disambiguation)
Happiness (disambiguation)